McLoughlin High School, known as Mac-Hi, is a public high school in Milton-Freewater, Oregon, United States.

It is named after John McLoughlin for his contributions to the state of Oregon.

Academics
In 2008, 85% of the school's seniors received a high school diploma. Of 124 students, 106 graduated, 14 dropped out, one received a modified diploma, and three were still in high school in 2009.

Sports
School sports include football, soccer, volleyball, cross country, wrestling, basketball, track, baseball, softball, golf, and tennis. The boys' soccer team has won three state championships, the wrestling team has won four, and the softball team has won two.

References

External links
 McLoughlin High School website

High schools in Umatilla County, Oregon
Public high schools in Oregon